This list of Spaghetti Western films includes Western films primarily produced and directed by Italian production companies between 1913 and 1978. For a list of non-Italian produced European Westerns see List of Euro-Western films.

In the 1960s, the Spaghetti Western genre grew in popularity. Films, particularly those of the influential Dollars trilogy, spawned numerous films of the same ilk and often with similar titles, particularly from the mid to late 1960s and early 1970s. By the end of the 1970s, Spaghetti Westerns had lost their following among mainstream cinema audiences and the production had ground to a virtual halt.

List by release date

Spaghetti westerns from the 1980s and 90s include:
 Comin' at Ya! (1981)
 Buddy Goes West (1981)
 Tex and the Lord of the Deep (1985)
 Django 2: il grande ritorno (1987)
 White Apache (1987)
 Scalps (1987)
 Lucky Luke (1991)
 Troublemakers (1994)
 Sons of Trinity (1995)
 Gunslinger's Revenge (1998)
 That Dirty Black Bag Tv Series (2022)

Italian Neo-Westerns include Man Hunt (1985) and They Call Me Renegade (1987).

The Spanish comedy film 800 Balas or 800 Bullets (2002) follows performers at a western themed tourist attraction in Almería, Spain, where the majority of Spaghetti Westerns were filmed, including a former stuntman who had worked on Leone's films.

See also
 List of Spaghetti Western filmmakers
 List of Euro-Western films

References

Further reading
Frayling, Christopher. Spaghetti Westerns: Cowboys and Europeans from Karl May to Sergio Leone. London: Routledge & Keagan Paul, 1981. 
Hughes, Howard. Once Upon a Time in the Italian West: The Filmgoers' Guide to Spaghetti Westerns. London and New York: I.B. Tauris, 2006. 
Riling, Yngve P, The Spaghetti Western Bible. Limited Edition. (Riling, 2011).
Weisser, Thomas. Spaghetti Westerns: The Good, The Bad, and The Violent: A Comprehensive, Illustrated Filmography of 558 Eurowesterns and Their Personnel, 1961–1977. Jefferson, North Carolina: McFarland, 1992.

External links
"Spaghetti Western" Movies (by Release Date), a listing by the Internet Movie Database
The Spaghetti Western Database, an online database of European westerns powered by MediaWiki

Lists of films by genre